In the field of mathematical analysis, a general Dirichlet series is an infinite series that takes the form of

 

A simple observation shows that an 'ordinary' Dirichlet series

 

is obtained by substituting  while a power series

 

is obtained when .

Fundamental theorems 

 

and convergent for any  where .

There are now three possibilities regarding the convergence of a Dirichlet series, i.e. it may converge for all, for none or for some values of s. By convention,  if the series converges nowhere and  if the series converges everywhere on the complex plane.

Abscissa of convergence 

Another equivalent definition is

 

The line  is called the line of convergence. The half-plane of convergence is defined as

 

The abscissa, line and half-plane of convergence of a Dirichlet series are analogous to radius, boundary and disk of convergence of a power series.

On the line of convergence, the question of convergence remains open as in the case of power series. However, if a Dirichlet series converges and diverges at different points on the same vertical line, then this line must be the line of convergence. The proof is implicit in the definition of abscissa of convergence. An example would be the series

 

Thus,  is the line of convergence.

These formulas are similar to the Cauchy–Hadamard theorem for the radius of convergence of a power series.

If  is divergent, i.e. , then  is given by

 

If  is convergent, i.e. , then  is given by

Abscissa of absolute convergence 

A Dirichlet series is absolutely convergent if the series

 

is convergent. As usual, an absolutely convergent Dirichlet series is convergent, but the converse is not always true.

A Dirichlet series may converge absolutely for all, for no or for some values of s.

 

The line and half-plane of absolute convergence can be defined similarly. There are also two formulas to compute .

If  is divergent, then  is given by

 

If  is convergent, then  is given by

 

In general, the abscissa of convergence does not coincide with abscissa of absolute convergence. Thus, there might be a strip between the line of convergence and absolute convergence where a Dirichlet series is conditionally convergent. The width of this strip is given by

 

In the case where L = 0, then

 

All the formulas provided so far still hold true for 'ordinary' Dirichlet series by substituting .

Other abscissas of convergence 

It is possible to consider other abscissas of convergence for a Dirichlet series. The abscissa of bounded convergence  is given by

while the abscissa of uniform convergence  is given by

These abscissas are related to the abscissa of convergence  and of absolute convergence  by the formulas

,

and a remarkable theorem of Bohr in fact shows that for any ordinary Dirichlet series where  (i.e. Dirichlet series of the form ) ,  and  Bohnenblust and Hille subsequently showed that for every number  there are Dirichlet series  for which 

A formula for the abscissa of uniform convergence  for the general Dirichlet series   is given as follows: for any , let , then

Analytic functions 

A function represented by a Dirichlet series

 

is analytic on the half-plane of convergence. Moreover, for

Further generalizations 

A Dirichlet series can be further generalized to the multi-variable case where , k = 2, 3, 4,..., or complex variable case where , m = 1, 2, 3,...

References 

 G. H. Hardy, and M. Riesz, The general theory of Dirichlet's series, Cambridge University Press, first edition, 1915.
 E. C. Titchmarsh, The theory of functions, Oxford University Press, second edition, 1939.
 Tom Apostol, Modular functions and Dirichlet series in number theory, Springer, second edition, 1990.
 A.F. Leont'ev, Entire functions and series of exponentials (in Russian), Nauka, first edition, 1982.
 A.I. Markushevich, Theory of functions of a complex variables (translated from Russian), Chelsea Publishing Company, second edition, 1977.
 J.-P. Serre, A Course in Arithmetic, Springer-Verlag, fifth edition, 1973.
 John E. McCarthy, Dirichlet Series, 2018.
 H. F. Bohnenblust and Einar Hille,  On the Absolute Convergence of Dirichlet Series,  Annals of Mathematics, Second Series, Vol. 32, No. 3 (Jul., 1931), pp. 600-622.

External links 

 
 

Complex analysis
Mathematical series